Theneidae is a family of sponges belonging to the order Tetractinellida.

Genera:
 Annulastrella Maldonado, 2002
 Cladothenea Koltun, 1964
 Thenea Gray, 1867

References

Sponge families